Leitch is a surname. Notable people with the surname include:
Archibald Leitch, Scottish architect
Barry Leitch, Scottish video game music composer
Bill Leitch, Canadian curler List of teams on the 2011–12 World Curling Tour
Billy Leitch (1895–1963), Irish footballer
Cecil Leitch, English golfer
David Leitch (settler) (1753–1794), founder of Leitch's Station, Kentucky
David Leitch (director), American director and stuntman
David Leitch (politician) (1923–1988), Australian politician
David R. Leitch (born 1948), American politician
Donovan Leitch, known as Donovan, Scottish musician
Donovan Leitch, Jr., actor and the son of the above
George Leitch (died 1907), English actor-manager and dramatist in Australia
Harry Leitch, Scottish squash player
Ione Skye Leitch, known as Ione Skye, actress and daughter of Donovan Leitch
Kellie Leitch (born 1970) Canadian politician
Maurice Leitch, writer
Michael Leitch (born 1988), Japanese rugby union player
Peter Leitch (disambiguation), several people:
 Sir Peter Leitch (businessman) (born 1944), New Zealand businessman nicknamed "The Mad Butcher"
 Peter Leitch (musician) (born 1944), Canadian jazz guitarist
 Peter Leitch (VC) (1820–1892), Scottish soldier who received the Victoria Cross
Ronnie Leitch (1953-2018), Sri Lankan Burgher actor, vocalist, and comedian
Scott Leitch, Scottish football player and manager
Thomas Leitch, American philosopher, academic, and film scholar
Will Leitch, American writer
Will Leitch (Northern Irish journalist)
William Leitch (disambiguation), several people
 William Leitch (footballer) (1863–1943), Tasmanian footballer, businessman and sports administrator
 William Leitch (scientist) (1814-1864), Scottish astronomer and rocket visionary
 William T. Leitch (1808–1885), mayor of Madison, Wisconsin, 1862–1865
 William Leighton Leitch (1804–1883), Scottish landscape watercolour painter and illustrator

See also
 Leitch Technology, Canadian technology company